Red Angel was an anti-ship rocket developed for the Royal Navy. The name was one of the British rainbow codes.

RP-3 ("Three-inch") rockets were used successfully for anti-shipping attacks during World War II. Larger unguided rockets were developed at the end of the war, such as the 'Uncle Tom' to meet Operational Requirement OR.1009. This used six of the three-inch (76 mm) rocket motors in a  airframe of  diameter.

Around 1950 the new Sverdlov-class cruisers caused concern in the Royal Navy, over the fear that the Soviet Navy was expanding into a wide-ranging blue water navy. A new weapon, Red Angel, was developed to meet this threat. This was larger than Uncle Tom and had a warhead intended to attack the deck armour of Sverdlovs. A salvo of six hits was thought to be sufficient to disable a Sverdlov.

Like Uncle Tom it had flip-out rear fins, but Tom's four large fins were replaced by six smaller ones.

It was first deployed on the Westland Wyvern turboprop, but had always been earmarked for the new jet naval strike aircraft developed in response to the Sverdlov threat, the Blackburn Buccaneer. The high-speed Buccaneer was noted for its rotating bomb bay and internal weapons stowage. This could carry four of the Red Angels.

Attack targeting from the 3-inch RP onwards had recognised an unusual behaviour: a projectile that entered the water short of the target ship would steer itself upwards on a curving trajectory and travel horizontally. This not only encouraged a more damaging 'wet hit' below the waterline, but it also made targeting easier: the viable target zone on the sea ahead of the target had an apparent height twice that of the hull.

This OR led to weapons that were longer-ranged and guided, such as the late 1940s 'Nozzle' and the later Green Cheese.

References 

Cold War anti-ship missiles of the United Kingdom
Abandoned military projects of the United Kingdom